Robert George Thompson (June 21, 1915 – October 16, 1965) was a distinguished US soldier who was awarded the Distinguished Service Cross (United States) during World War II but was later jailed for several years for his communist sympathies.

Career

Spanish Civil War

Thompson's first foray into war was with the Spanish Republicans in the Civil War in Spain against General Franco and the Spanish Nationalists, as a battalion commander with the all-American volunteer Abraham Lincoln Brigade.

World War II

Following the Spanish Civil War, Thompson saw action during World War II in the Pacific Theater. He was cited for extraordinary heroism during the American New Guinea Campaign, was awarded the Distinguished Service Cross and was approved for a battlefield commission as an officer. The citation read:  For extraordinary heroism in action near Tarakena, New Guinea, on January 11, 1943. Volunteering to lead a small patrol in an attempt to establish a foothold on the opposite shore, Staff Sergeant Thompson swam the swollen and rapid Konembi River in broad daylight and under heavy enemy fire. Armed only with a pistol and hand grenades, he assisted in towing a rope to the other shore where he remained under cover of the bank and directed the crossing of his platoon. Staff Sergeant Thompson then led the platoon against two enemy machine-gun emplacements which dominated the crossing, and wiped them out. The success of this action permitted the advance of the entire company and secured a bridge-head for the advance of the following units.

Communist Party

Following the war, Thompson was involved with the leadership of the Communist Party USA, and was convicted in the Foley Square trial, alongside the rest of the party leadership, for violating the Smith Act. He was sentenced to imprisonment for three years. After the Supreme Court affirmed his conviction, he absconded, and for this he was convicted of criminal contempt and ordered to serve an additional four-year sentence.  While serving his sentence, Thompson was assaulted by a group of Yugoslav fascists who had jumped ship in the United States, one of whom cracked Thompson's skull with a metal pipe while standing on a lunch line.

Following his release Thompson continued with the Communist Party including organizing protests against the Vietnam War.

Death
Thompson suffered a fatal heart attack on October 16, 1965. As controversial in death as in life, after initially granted burial at Arlington National Cemetery, his post-service activities led the Army, under pressure from Congress, to rescind its permission. Subsequently, the Army was ordered by the United States Court of Appeals for the District of Columbia Circuit to permit the interment.

Legacy
Striking a dissenting chord days after his death, Pulitzer Prize-winning journalist Murray Kempton wrote:And so, an American who was brave has been judged and disposed of by Americans who are cowards of the least excusable sort, cowards who have very little to fear. Yesterday the Army called Robert Thompson's widow and said that it would send his ashes wherever she wished. Wherever those ashes go, the glory of America goes with them.

References

1915 births
1965 deaths
Abraham Lincoln Brigade members
American anti–Vietnam War activists
American communists
United States Army personnel of World War II
People convicted under the Smith Act
People from Grants Pass, Oregon
Recipients of the Distinguished Service Cross (United States)
Members of the Communist Party USA
United States Army officers